Harem (Հարեմ, Arm.) is an Armenian language novella by the great Armenian novelist Raffi, published in the book Punj (Փունջ, Arm.) in 1874.

The book is set in the royal harem of the prince of Persia the 19th century, probably after the Russo-Persian War (1804-1813). Two of the characters in the book, the Prince and Zeynep, had real-life analogues in Fath-Ali Shah Qajar, and one of his 165 consorts, an Armenian from Tiflis who was given the name Gul-Pirhan. According to Raffi's biographer, Murad Meneshian, Raffi's adversaries translated Harem to Persian in 1876 and took it to Mozaffar ad-Din Shah Qajar, who at the time was the governor of the province where Raffi was living in Tabriz, when the reaction of Raffi's adversaries caused his exile from Agulis.

Translations

English translations

Beyon Miloyan and Kimberley McFarlane (2020).

References

1874 novels
Novels by Raffi
Armenian-language novels